Taisuke (written: 泰介, 泰輔, 泰右, 泰舗, 泰佑, 退助, 大介, 大輔 or 太亮) is a masculine Japanese given name. Notable people with the name include:

, Japanese footballer
, Japanese footballer
, Japanese politician
, Japanese footballer
, Japanese footballer
, Japanese footballer
, Japanese footballer
, Japanese footballer
, Japanese mixed martial artist
, Japanese judoka
, Japanese politician
, Japanese professional baseball player

Japanese masculine given names